Squash is a 2002 French short film (27 min / 29 min runtime) directed and written by Lionel Bailliu. The film has won multiple awards at film festivals and was nominated for an Academy Award in the Best Live Action Short Film category in 2004. The film stars Malcolme Conrath as 'Alexandre' and Eric Savin as 'Charles'.
 
It was used as the basis for a longer film (103 Minutes) called Fair Play in 2006. The opening scene of the long feature are complete repeats of the short film, but with actor Malcolm Conrath is replaced by Jérémie Rénier to play 'Alexandre'.

Synopsis
Squash depicts an increasingly aggressive squash game between two businessmen, Alexandre and his boss, Charles. The game is presented as a metaphor for office politics.

Awards and nominations

It also was given the Lutin Award for Best Editing to Vincent Tabaillon.

References

External links

2002 films
2000s French-language films
2002 comedy-drama films
2002 short films
French drama short films
French comedy-drama films
2000s French films